George Abud is a Lebanese-American actor, playwright, and musician. He is known for playing Camal in the Off-Broadway and Broadway productions of The Band's Visit, receiving a Daytime Emmy Award for his work on the show's NBC Today Show performance.

Early life and education 
Abud was born in Detroit to Lebanese-American parents Gary and Paulette Abud. He attended Wayne State University and graduated with a Bachelor of Fine Arts in theatre acting before moving to New York City in 2012.

Career 
Abud first appeared in New York in the 2014 revival of Rodgers and Hammerstein's Allegro directed by John Doyle at Classic Stage Company. His adaptation of “Children and Art” from Sunday in the Park with George was selected to be played live at New York City Center for Stephen Sondheim.  Jeanine Tesori recounted: 

Abud made his Broadway debut in 2015 in John Kander & Fred Ebb's final musical, The Visit, starring Chita Rivera and Roger Rees.  

Later, he originated the role of Camal in the Off-Broadway and subsequent Broadway production of The Band's Visit. Zachary Stewart of TheaterMania wrote: "Playing the role of violinist Camal, George Abud consistently wows with both his comic timing and musical virtuosity. His voice gloriously rings through the theater in Itzik's Lullaby, during which he plays an oud." After leaving The Band's Visit in late 2018, Abud was cast in the Off-Broadway production of Bertolt Brecht's The Resistible Rise of Arturo Ui starring Raúl Esparza at Classic Stage Company. Sara Holdren of Vulture noted: "George Abud is a nimble, fast-talking delight…".

In 2019, Abud portrayed Lewis Chapman in the musical version of August Rush directed by John Doyle at the Paramount Theatre in Aurora, IL. Next, he was cast in Annie Get Your Gun directed by Sarna Lapine at Bay Street Theater in Sag Harbor, NY. 

In 2020, he starred as Nerd Face in the new pop musical Emojiland, Off-Broadway at the Duke on 42nd Street, about which Laura Collins-Hughes of The New York Times said: "But with the arrival of Nerd Face, played with wonderfully sweet dorkiness by George Abud, you can feel the air turn electric. There is a very good chance that you will be as instantly smitten with him as he is with Smize (Schein) in her polka-dotted fit-and-flare dress."

It was announced in May 2022 that Abud would star as Marinetti in the new musical Lempicka by Carson Kreitzer and Matt Gould at La Jolla Playhouse directed by Rachel Chavkin. The San Diego Union Tribune wrote: “George Abud is another ideal hand-in-glove fit for the role of Italian pro-fascist modernist Filippo Marinetti. His edgy performance of the high-flying song 'Perfection' is one of those moments in a show where thoughts of future Tony nominations dance in the head — for him, as well as for Espinosa and Iman.”

Stage credits

Theatre credits

Awards and nominations

References 

American male television actors
American male stage actors
Daytime Emmy Award winners
American people of Lebanese descent
1990 births
Living people